Sadhan Pande (13 November 1950 – 20 February 2022) was an Indian politician who served as Minister for Consumer Affairs & Self Help Group & Self-Employment, Government of West Bengal. He was also an MLA, elected from the Maniktala constituency in the 2011 West Bengal state assembly election. Previously, he was a Congress Leader and six times elected MLA from Burtola till 2011. After his defeat in Lok Sabha Elections 1998, from Calcutta North East, he left Congress and joined All India Trinamool Congress. Pande died in Mumbai on 20 February 2022, at the age of 71. He suffered from kidney ailments prior to his death.

References 

1950 births
2022 deaths
Trinamool Congress politicians from West Bengal
Politicians from Kolkata
State cabinet ministers of West Bengal
West Bengal MLAs 2021–2026
West Bengal MLAs 2016–2021
West Bengal MLAs 2011–2016
West Bengal MLAs 2006–2011
West Bengal MLAs 2001–2006
West Bengal MLAs 1996–2001
West Bengal MLAs 1991–1996